Bayard is a masculine given name. Notable people with the name include:

Bayard Clarke (1815–1884), United States Representative from New York
Bayard Elfvin (born 1981), American assistant Northwestern University soccer coach and retired goalkeeper
Bayard H. Faulkner (1894–1983), American politician from New Jersey, mayor of Montclair, New Jersey
Bayard Johnson (1952–2016), American film director
Bayard Rustin (1912–1987), American civil rights activist, mentor of Martin Luther King, Jr.
Herbert Bayard Swope (1882–1958), American editor and journalist
Bayard Taylor (1825–1878), American author from Pennsylvania
Bayard Veiller (1869–1943), American screenwriter, producer and film director

Fictional characters include 
Bayard Hamar, the bloodhound in Tim Burton's 2010 film Alice In Wonderland
Bayard Sartoris, the name of two generations of men in William Faulkner's Yoknapatawpha County series of novels, first appearing in Sartoris
Bayard Delavel, the engineer and Nadine Pelham's love and husband in Elinor Glyn's novel The Great Moment and the movie The Great Moment
Bayard, the name of the hunter who is opposed to WWE building a city in his forest in the film Scooby-Doo! WrestleMania Mystery
King Bayard of Mercia, a minor character played by Clive Russell in the BBC fantasy adventure Merlin, appearing in the fourth episode of the first series The Poisoned Chalice, however does have mentions in later episodes

Masculine given names
English masculine given names